The Ballad of Immortal Joe is a Canadian animated short film, which premiered at the 2015 Toronto International Film Festival. Directed by Hector Herrera and written and produced by Pazit Cahlon, the film is a tribute to the cowboy poetry of Robert W. Service. The film, the third installment in Herrera's "Beastly Bards" series of animated shorts, is narrated by actor Kenneth Welsh, and soundtracked by the alternative country band The Sadies.

In 2016 the film won the Canadian Screen Award for Best Animated Short at the 4th Canadian Screen Awards.

References

External links 
 

2015 short films
Canadian animated short films
Best Animated Short Film Genie and Canadian Screen Award winners
2015 animated films
2015 films
2010s English-language films
2010s Canadian films